Khün, or Tai Khün (Tai Khün:  ,), also known as Kengtung tai, Kengtung Shan, is the language of the Tai Khün people of Kengtung, Shan State, Myanmar. It is a Tai language that is closely related to Thai and Lao. It is also spoken in Chiang Rai Province, Thailand, and Yunnan Province, China.

Geographical distribution
In China, there are about 10,000 Tai Khuen people in the following areas of Yunnan province (Gao 1999).
Menglian County 孟连县: in Mengma Town 勐马镇, and in Meng'aba 勐阿坝 (12 villages total)
Ximeng County 西盟县: in Mengsuo 勐梭
Lincang Prefecture (small, scattered population)

Phonology

Tones
There are contrastive five or six tones in Khün. The varieties spoken in Keng Tung City, Kang Murng, and Kat Fah have five tones, and the variety spoken in Murng Lang has six tones. Keng Tung City, Kang Murng, and Murng Lang are part of Kengtung Township.

Smooth syllables
The table below presents the tones in the varieties spoken in Keng Tung City, Kang Murng, Kat Fah, and Murng Lang. These tones occur in smooth syllables which are open syllables or closed syllables ending in a sonorant sound, such as /m/, /n/, /ŋ/, /w/, or /j/.

Checked syllables
Three of the five or six phonemic tones occur in checked syllables which are closed syllables ending in a glottal stop (/ʔ/) or an obstruent sound, such as /p/, /t/, or /k/. The table below presents the three tones in the varieties spoken in Keng Tung City, Kang Murng, and Kat Fah.

See also
 Northern Thai language
 Shan language

References

Owen, R. Wyn. 2012. "A tonal analysis of contemporary Tai Khuen varieties". Journal of the Southeast Asian Linguistics Society (JSEALS) 5:12-31.
Petsuk, Rasi (1978). General characteristics of the Khün language. Mahidol University MA thesis.

External links
Khün alphabet

Languages of Laos
Languages of Thailand
Languages of Myanmar
Southwestern Tai languages